The M'alayah (Arabic: معلايه or  معلاية / ALA-LC: ma‘alāyah) is a kind of dance common in North Africa and Eastern Arabia.
The dance is usually misnamed by calling it various names such as um-alaya, dagni, etc.

Origin 
The term's origin is doubtful due to the obscurity of the rather taboo nature of the dance but it originally came from the Swahili Coast. The M'alayah's contemporary equivalent in East Africa is the Baikoko and chura of Tanzania. 

The dance is sexually suggestive in nature, with women tying up their lower torso with a piece of cloth or Keffiyeh, and performing sensual fast movements. There is no set pattern and method of performing the dance although some of its movements can be likened to those in bellydance, hip hop ("booty popping"), or Mapouka. It is known for its fast sensual movements of the buttocks and backside.Most of the times these dances are seen in Arab countries such as Saudi Arabia, Oman and the United Arab Emirates.

Primarily this dance is more often performed by groups that usually comprise singers, dancers and also backup musicians. These groups perform in special occasions such as weddings. The dance is accompanied by singing various songs that are unique to this type of dance.

References
 "Sur: where the drums of Arabic Swahili music are still beating in Oman"

See also
 Belly dance
 Makossa
 Mapouka

Group dances
Middle Eastern dances
Arab culture